Xiajiasi Reservoir, also known as Mulan Lake, is a large-sized reservoir in Mulan Township, northeast of Huangpi District, Wuhan City, Hubei Province, China, located at the upper reaches of Xajiasi River, a tributary of the She River. It is a large water conservancy project mainly for irrigation and flood control, and also has comprehensive benefits such as breeding and tourism.

The construction of Xiajiasi Reservoir started in November 1959 and was completed in November 1965.  The reservoir has a dam height of 30.8 meters, with a surface area of 2,000 hectares and a storage capacity of 253.5 million cubic meters.

References

Reservoirs in China
Buildings and structures in Hubei
Buildings and structures completed in 1965